The NEW Heavyweight Championship is a heavyweight championship owned and promoted by Northeast Wrestling (NEW). The inaugural champion was Bam Bam Bigelow. The current champion is Matt Taven, who is in his third reign.

Title history
Bam Bam Bigelow was the inaugural champion. Brian Anthony holds four records, 1st the most reigns with three, 2nd his first reign is the longest reign at 1,051 days, 3rd his third reign is shortest reign at less than one day and last longest combined reign at 1,114 days.

Combined reigns 

References

External links
  NEW Heavyweight Title History at Cagematch.net
Heavyweight wrestling championships